Charles Colcock Jones Jr. (October 28, 1831 – July 19, 1893) was a politician, attorney and author from Georgia, United States. He was the mayor of Savannah, Georgia, immediately prior to Sherman's March to the Sea.

Life and career
Jones was born to Charles Colcock Jones Sr., a Presbyterian minister. He graduated with a bachelor's degree from Princeton University in 1852, then followed with a law degree from Harvard University in 1855. 

He married twice: first to Ruth Berrien Whitehead, then to Ruth's cousin once removed, Eva Berrien Eve (who had been a bridesmaid at their wedding). His son, Edgeworth Casey Jones (1867–1931), became a prominent memorialist, having changed his name to Charles Edgeworth Jones.

Jones became mayor of Savannah in 1860. Because of the war, he nearly lost his fortune and had to move to New York City.  He was elected a member of the American Antiquarian Society in 1869. He was elected as a member to the American Philosophical Society in 1881. In 1877 he moved back to Augusta, Georgia.

Death 
On July 19, 1893, Jones died of Bright's disease. He is interred in Summerville Cemetery in Augusta.

Literary works
He published almost one hundred writings, including the following notable books:
Historical Sketch of the Chatham Artillery (1867)
The Siege of Savannah in December, 1864 (1874)
Antiquities of the Southern Indians, particularly of the Georgia tribes (1878)
The Dead Towns of Georgia (1878)
History of Georgia (1883)
Negro Myths of the Georgia Coast (1888)

References

External links

 
 Georgia Archaeology Who's Who
New Georgia Encyclopedia: Charles C. Jones Jr. (1831-1893)
The Siege of Savannah in December, 1864, and the Confederate Operations in Georgia and the Third Military District of South Carolina During General Sherman's March from Atlanta to the Sea (1875), Louis Round Wilson Library
 

Mayors of Savannah, Georgia
Harvard Law School alumni
Princeton University alumni
19th-century American historians
19th-century American male writers
1831 births
1893 deaths
Deaths from nephritis
19th-century American politicians
Members of the American Antiquarian Society
American male non-fiction writers
Historians from Georgia (U.S. state)